"Yester-Me, Yester-You, Yesterday" is a 1969 soul song written by Ron Miller and Bryan Wells, released by American Motown singer-songwriter-musician Stevie Wonder on the album My Cherie Amour (1969). The song continued Wonder's success on the pop charts. It reached number 7 on the pop singles chart and become Wonder's ninth Top 10 single of the 1960s. The single fared even better on the UK singles chart where it reached number 2 in November 1969, and at that time, it was Wonder's biggest UK hit.

Stevie recorded also an Italian version with the title "Solo te, solo me, solo noi" (Only you, only me, only us). The song was later reworked into an unusual, electronic version by Jennifer Rush on her 1985 Movin' album.

Background
The song had been first recorded, in 1966, by blue-eyed Motown soul singer Chris Clark.

At the time the song was released, Wonder was going through some vocal problems and was required to wait before recording a song. Due to this, instead of making Wonder record new ones, they decided to release songs that he had recorded years earlier, and this song was one of them (it was recorded two years earlier). The song's main theme is nostalgia for a loved one.

Chart performance

Weekly charts

Year-end charts

Personnel
 Lead vocals by Stevie Wonder
 Background vocals by The Originals (Freddie Gorman, Walter Gaines, Hank Dixon, C.P. Spencer) and The Andantes (Jackie Hicks, Marlene Barrow, and Louvain Demps)
 Instrumentation by The Funk Brothers.

Covers
This track was covered by the disco band Boystown Gang and by jazz saxophonist Houston Person.

References

External links 
List of cover versions of "Yester-Me, Yester-You, Yesterday" at SecondHandSongs.com

Songs about nostalgia
1969 singles
Stevie Wonder songs
Number-one singles in Norway
Songs written by Ron Miller (songwriter)
Motown singles
1966 songs